Highland Lakes is a census-designated place in Shelby County, Alabama, United States. Its population was 3,926 as of the 2010 census.

Geography

Highland Lakes is located within the Highland Lakes subdivision off U.S. Route 280 atop Double Oak Mountain, a southern extension of the
Appalachian Mountains. Via U.S. 280, downtown Birmingham is 16 mi (26 km) northwest, and Chelsea is
6 mi (10 km) southeast.

Demographics

References

Census-designated places in Shelby County, Alabama
Census-designated places in Alabama